The milk crate challenge, also known as the crate challenge, is a video challenge that became viral online in August 2021. The challenge involves stacking milk crates into a structure that resembles a podium, with both sides of the structure functioning as stairs. The participant is expected to climb up to the top of the crates and climb back down without destroying the structure or falling, risking injury. The activity has faced criticism by health professionals for its unnecessary risk to personal health. Social media platform TikTok that helped popularize the trend said it would eliminate search results for "milk crate challenge" citing its policy that "prohibits content that promotes or glorifies dangerous acts."

Accidents 
Due to the instability of the stacked crates, participants often fall while ascending or descending the podium, risking serious injury. Falling during the challenge has led to a variety of injuries, including dislocated shoulders and rotator cuff tears, ACL tears, meniscus tears, broken wrists and even spinal cord injuries.

Reaction 
Some medical professionals have warned against attempting the challenge, saying that the relative instability of the stacked crates poses a high risk of injury. On August 25, 2021, TikTok made a statement that they will remove videos with the hashtag and return a message about TikTok's community standards when a user looks up the #MilkCrateChallenges, according to its guidelines. The challenge has also led to the concern of theft within the dairy industry and is considered a crime in many states. Dairy industries lose around $80 million per year due to theft according to the IDFA in 2012. Some articles noted that there was increased risk to participants as many hospitals were dealing with a surge of the Delta variant of COVID–19 in August 2021.

Single-stack climbing

An earlier and similar challenge is a crate-climbing task offered as a team building exercise by some outdoor activity centers. In the task, participants assemble and climb a tall, narrow stack of crates, alternating between climbing the tower and placing more crates to increase its height. When organized by professionals, the use of safety lines and helmets makes the activity safer than in the viral video trend.

See also 
 Gallon smashing
 Milk chugging
 Consumption of Tide Pods
 Benadryl challenge, 2020 challenge on TikTok that encouraged participants to deliberately overdose on diphenhydramine, marketed in the US as Benadryl
 Devious licks, 2021 challenge on TikTok that encouraged students to engage in theft and vandalism of school property

References 

2020s fads and trends
Challenges
Internet memes introduced in 2021
TikTok